The Unbeliever is a 1918 American silent propaganda film made towards the end of World War I. It was directed by Alan Crosland for the Edison Company towards its last days as a functioning film-making company. It stars Raymond McKee and Marguerite Courtot, who married a few years later, and Erich von Stroheim.

Plot
As described in a film magazine, Philip Landicutt has always held the people of the lower classes as being far beneath him. He also is prejudiced against anyone with German blood and does not believe in God. He joins the Marine Corps and goes to France where constant association with the men in his battery and nearly answering the call from above during an action makes him see things differently. He returns home, crippled, but with a better knowledge of man and God. During a raid he rescued a Belgian girl who is later sent to stay with his mother. When he comes home and sees her, he finds himself in love.

Cast
Marguerite Courtot as Virginie Harbrok
Raymond McKee as Philip Landicutt
Erich von Stroheim as Lieutenant Kurt von Schnieditz
Kate Lester as Margaret Landicutt
Frank de Vernon as Uncle "Jemmy" Landicutt
Mortimer Martine as Eugene Harbrok (credited as Mortimer Martini)
Blanche Davenport as Madam Harbrok
Harold Hollacher as Pierre Harbrok  (credited as Harold Hallacher)
Darwin Karr as "Lefty"
Earl Schenck as Emanuel Muller
Gertrude Norman as Marianne Marnholm
Lew Hart as Hoffman
Thomas Holcomb as The Commanding Officer (credited as Major Thomas Holcomb)
Lieutenant J. F. Rorke as Lieutenant Terence O'Shaughnessy
Sergeant Moss Gill as Albert Mullins
Major Ross E. Rowell 
Captain Thomas Sterett
Percy Webb 
Corporal Bob Ryland

Reception
Like many American films of the time, The Unbeliever was subject to cuts by city and state film censorship boards. For example, the Chicago Board of Censors required a cut, in Reel 4, of executing a woman and child and two views of man pulling young woman's waist down.

Preservation
A print is preserved at the Library of Congress. As a still-surviving feature from Edison, The Unbeliever can be found on Kino's omnibus of Edison Company shorts and features; it is the last film on the final DVD. with a new score by Donald Sosin. Alpha Video also has released a DVD version.

References

External links

 

Andrews, Mary Raymond Shipman (1915), The Three Things; the Forge in Which the Soul of a Man Was Tested, Boston: Little, Brown and Company, on the Internet Archive

1918 films
American silent feature films
Films directed by Alan Crosland
Films based on American novels
American black-and-white films
1918 drama films
Silent American drama films
Edison Manufacturing Company films
Films produced by George Kleine
American World War I propaganda films
1910s American films
Silent war films